In 2018, the Women's Premier League decided to split the All-Stars by conference, allowing for one Eastern Conference Team and one Western Conference Team.

Coaching Staff 

 Eastern Conference: Rosalind Chou
 Western Conference: Kittery Wagner-Ruiz

Players

References

Women's Premier League Rugby All-Stars Rosters